The Master is a character and the main antagonist of the 1997 role-playing video game Fallout. Born Richard Moreau, he was transformed into an amorphous creature by a mutagenic virus, and later absorbed the genetic material of other victims. He created a race of Super Mutants after experimenting with the virus and decided to transform humanity into these mutants to correct for their weakness.

The Fallout development team created the character concept as a synthesis of a man, a woman, and a computer terminal mutated together. The character was designed to be morally ambiguous, by creating a villain who saw himself as a hero. The Master has been included in several rankings of best video game antagonists, due to his sympathetic nature, and his robust reactions to the player's input.

Appearances 
Fallout is a role-playing video game that takes place in 2161, after a global nuclear war destroyed most of human civilization a century earlier. Information about the Master is picked up throughout gameplay prior to the player's final confrontation of the Master in the cathedral. The Master was originally a human named Richard Moreau who was exiled from Vault City as a murder suspect. He changed his surname to Grey and migrated to a merchant town called the Hub, where he became a doctor. Grey met a trader named Harold in 2102, and they form a joint expedition to discover the source of the mutant attacks on Harold's caravans. This led them to Mariposa Military Base, where the expedition group is overwhelmed by mutant forces. Grey is knocked into a vat of the Forced Evolutionary Virus (F.E.V.), which mutated him into a blob-like creature that expanded himself by absorbing other humans.

After a month of simmering, Grey crawled out of the vat and installed himself inside a vault. Naming himself "the Master", he decided that humanity was inept and had to be replaced by a master race. Through his experimentations on humans with the F.E.V., the Master created the Super Mutants, a race of virtually immortal monsters that were immune to disease and radiation. Deeming Super Mutants to be the superior race, the Master went on a campaign to replace all the humans with the Super Mutants by infecting them with the virus. To accomplish this, the Master created a cult called the Children of the Cathedral as a front for his campaign, using aliases such as the "Holy Flame" or "Father Hope" when dealing with his followers.

When the player engages the Master near the end of the game, they can confront the Master with a number of different skills and approaches. The player can enter combat with the Master and his Super Mutant allies. The player can also convince the Master to abandon his plans by revealing to him that Super Mutants are sterile, a revelation that causes the Master to commit suicide. Skipping the confrontation entirely, the player can sneak into his chambers and find a hidden nuclear arsenal that can blow up the cathedral, killing the Master. The player also has the option of joining the Master's campaign, which will lead to a bad ending in which Vault 13 is raided by Super Mutants. If the player character has a low enough intelligence, they will only be able to call the Master ugly, resulting in the Master believing that even the F.E.V. would not help the player character.

The Master appears in the Fallout: New California expansion for the board game Fallout, developed by Fantasy Flight Games, in the "Rise of the Master" scenario. The scenario is based on the video game Fallout "Unity" story arc.

Concept and design 

According to producer Tim Cain, the Fallout development team conceived of a faction of mutants who grew their ranks by dipping people into virus vats. During the discussion, someone wondered what would happen if more than one person was dropped into the vat. This led to the team to conceptualize the Master as a man and a woman that fell into the vats along with a computer terminal. Cain enjoyed modelling, animating, and writing the Master's dialog, particularly because the Master switched between three voices: male, female, and electronic. The Master was voiced by Jim Cummings and Kath Soucie. The Master's birth surname, Moreau, references the titular mad scientist of the 1896 novel The Island of Doctor Moreau by H. G. Wells.

The Master's character was an example of the game developers adding moral ambiguity to the game because he was a villain who viewed himself as a well-intentioned hero. Assistant designer Scott Bennie described the Master's backstory as an example of their intention of "hit[ting] the player with an emotional sledgehammer as often as possible" with their story design. The development team became confident in their vision after the audio director reacted to the voice-switching concept, and every department believed the Master would be a great antagonist.

Reception 
The Master has received acclaim from critics as one of the best villainous characters in video game history. Paste Magazine ranked the Master as among the best characters in the Fallout series, stating that "[e]very villain in the series has shades of this guy/blob, and I’m not quite sure anything that’s coming after the character hard has ever topped this guy." GameSpot ranked him as among the best computer game villains for his moral ambiguity and Cummings's "chilling" portrayal.  Ron Whitaker of The Escapist ranked the Master among the best video game boss battles, explaining that the character is memorable because he is "not entirely evil". Alan Bradley of GamesRadar+ thought the encounter with the Master made the game's final area "one of the most striking storytelling devices of its era".

The encounter with the Master has been lauded for its multiple solutions, particularly the option of convincing him his plan will fail. PC Gamer placed him as the one of the best computer game bosses, citing the multiple solutions and the boss fight being optional. Multiple journalists especially praised the option to convince the Master that he is wrong, with Kotaku describing it as "unforgettable", and UGO describing it as "fun". IGN said that this aforementioned ability proved that in role-playing games, dialogue can be just as valid as fighting. Praising the final confrontation, USGamer Mike Williams said, "Even at its end, Fallout is about player choice, and the choices available to you are pretty clever."

References

External links 
The Master at the Fallout Wiki

Cyborg characters in video games
Fallout (series)
Fictional cult leaders
Fictional exiles
Fictional murderers
Fictional physicians
Fictional warlords in video games
Microsoft antagonists
Mutant characters in video games
Science fiction video game characters
Video game bosses
Video game characters introduced in 1997
Video game characters who have mental powers